The 2016–17 season is Motherwell's thirty-second consecutive season in the top flight of Scottish football and the fourth in the newly established Scottish Premiership, having been promoted from the Scottish First Division at the end of the 1984–85 season. Motherwell will also compete in the League Cup and the Scottish Cup.

Season review
Following the conclusion of the 2015–16 season, Brett Long, Jack Leitch, David Clarkson and Wes Fletcher were released by the club following the end of their contracts, whilst loan players Connor Ripley and Morgaro Gomis returned to their parent clubs. Also at the end of the 2015–16 season, first team players Steven Hammell, Stephen McManus, Craig Samson, Keith Lasley, Craig Moore, James McFadden, David Ferguson, Ben Hall and Scott McDonald were all offered new contracts, as were Under 20 players Dylan Mackin, Robbie Leith, Jack McMillan, Ross MacLean and Ryan Watters. Lasley signed a new one-year contract on 22 June 2016.

On 2 June 2016, Motherwell were drawn into Group F of the 2016–17 Scottish League Cup, resulting in matches against Rangers, Annan Athletic, East Stirlingshire and Stranraer at the end of July. On 5 June 2016, Motherwell announced their first 4 pre-season friendlies, with another two to be confirmed at a later date. Steven Hammell signed a new two-year contract with Motherwell on 29 June, with Scott McDonald signing a new one-year on 1 July 2016.

On 9 July 2015, Motherwell announced that assistant manager Steve Robinson had left the club to take up the vacant Oldham Athletic managers job.

On 7 December 2016, Ross MacLean signed a new two-and-a-half-year deal with Motherwell, keeping him at the club until the summer of 2019.

Transfers
On 23 June 2016, Motherwell announced their first signings of the season, with Ben Heneghan, Richard Tait and Jacob Blyth all joining the club. Motherwell announced Dean Brill as their fourth summer signing on 27 June. Two days later, 29 June, Stephen Pearson left the club and returned to the Indian Super League with Atlético de Kolkata. On 5 July, Motherwell announced the signing of Carl McHugh on a free-transfer after his Plymouth Argyle contract had expired. Craig Clay became Motherwells sixth summer signing on 10 August, signing a two-year contract.

On 15 August 2016, Louis Laing joined Notts County on loan until 16 January 2017.

On 31 August, transfer deadline day, Motherwell saw the departure of Marvin Johnson to Oxford United for an undisclosed fee, and Luke Watt to Stranraer on loan until January 2017. Also on the 31st, Motherwell signed Ryan Bowman on a two-year contract from Gateshead for an undisclosed fee, and Luka Belić on a six-month loan deal from West Ham United.

On 14 September, Lee Lucas, who had been on trial early in the summer, signed a short-term deal with the club until January 2017.

January Transfers
On 1 January 2017, Motherwell announced that Dom Thomas had moved to Queen of the South on loan until the end of the season.

On 26 January, Motherwell signed midfielder Elliott Frear from Forest Green Rovers, with Russell Griffiths joining the club on loan for the remainder of the season from Everton the following day. Also on the 27th, Luka Belić loan came to an end, Dean Brill was released by the club, Dylan Mackin joined Alloa Athletic on loan for the remainder of the season, and Zak Jules joined until the end of the season from Reading.

On 31 January 2017, Motherwell signed Sunderland goalkeeper Oliver Pain on loan until the end of the season and Shea Gordon to the U20's, whilst Luke Watt joined East Fife for the remainder of the season.

February
On 2 February, Stephen Pearson returned to the club, signing a contract until the end of the season.

On 28 February, manager Mark McGhee was sacked by the club, with Steve Robinson being put in temporary charge.

March
On 15 March, Robinson was given a permanent contract as the club's manager. On 23 March, Kieran Kennedy left the club by mutual consent.

Transfers

In

Out

Loans in

Loans out

Released

Trial

Squad

On loan

Left club during season

Friendlies

Competitions

Premiership

League table

Results by round

Results summary

Results

Scottish Cup

League Cup

Group stage

Knockout stage

Challenge Cup

Squad statistics

Appearances

|-
|colspan="14"|Players away from the club on loan:

|-
|colspan="14"|Players who left Motherwell during the season:

|}

Goal scorers

Disciplinary record

See also
 List of Motherwell F.C. seasons

Notes

References

External links
 Motherwell F.C. Website
 BBC My Club Page
 Motherwell F.C. Newsnow

Motherwell F.C. seasons
Motherwell